Empusa binotata is a species of praying mantis in family Empusidae.

See also
List of mantis genera and species

References

binotata
Insects described in 1839